Kamōš is an ancient Semitic deity whose existence is recorded during the Iron Age. Kamōš was the supreme deity of the Canaanite state of Moab and the patron-god of its population, the Moabites, who in consequence were called the "People of Kamōš". Kamōš is primarily attested from Moabite inscriptions and the Hebrew Bible.

Name

The name of Kamōš is of yet uncertain origin, and it is unclear whether it was related to the name of the Eblaite deity , or the Ugaritic divine name , or an epithet of the Mesopotamian god  which might have meant "bull," .

Kamōš is mentioned in the Hebrew Bible under the name , where the vowels were intentionally patterned after the Hebrew word .

History

Origins
The significant gap between the attestation of the Eblaite Kamiš during the 23rd century BC and that of the Moabite Kamōš in the 9th century BC, with an absence of any reference to either of these deities in Amorite names from the 21st to the 15th centuries BC, nevertheless make this identification between Kamiš and Kamōš very uncertain.

Iron Age
In the 9th century BC, Kamōš was the principal god of the Canaanite kingdom of Moab, whose worship was characteristic of the Moabites. The cult of Kamōš appears to have been limited to the Moabites, and his name does not appear in contemporary Ancient North Arabian inscriptions.

The astral role of ʿAštar itself is attested by his mention along with the Moon-God Šaggar in the Dayr ʿAllā inscription, the subject of which is largely the Sun-goddess Šamāš, thus forming a triad of the Sun, Moon, and Venus similarly to the one attested in South Arabia, and suggesting a South Arabian religious influence in Moab.

During the 9th century BC, the kingdom of Moab had been subdued by its fellow Canaanite kingdom of Israel during the rule of the latter state's kings ʿOmrī and ʾAḥʾāb. The 9th century BC Moabite king Mōšaʿ, who ascended to the Moabite throne during the reign of Ahab, wrote in his inscriptions that the Israelites had been able to subdue Moab because Kamōš was angry with his people, that is the Moabites.

Mōšaʿ soon rebelled against Israelite suzerainty and embarked on an expansionist policy against the Israelites, which he carried out as holy war performed as a ritual to Kamōš. After Mōšaʿ had captured the Gadite city of ʿAṭārōt, he slaughtered all of its inhabitants as an accomplishment of a vow he had made to Kamōš and to the population of Moab, and he brought the warden of ʿAṭārōt, the Gadite chief ʾUrī-ʾEl, to Qarīyōt, where Mōšaʿ sacrificed him to Kamōš. When, following his capture of ʿAṭārōt, Mōšaʿ conquered the town of Nebo, he sacrificed the whole Israelite population of the town to ʿAštar-Kamōš, likely because of ʿAštar's function as an avenger deity who was invoked in curses against enemies, and he brought all the lambs of the sanctuary of Yahū, at Nebo to the sanctuary of Kamōš, where he sacrificed them to Kamōš.

Mōšaʿ recorded in his victory stela that he had built a high place dedicated to Kamōš in the citadel of the Moabite capital of Ḏaybān to thank the god for assuring his triumph in his military campaign against the Israelites.

Later periods
Kamōš was still worshipped after the Moabite kingdom came to an end, and his name was used as a theophoric element by individuals of Moabite descent living in Egypt and Babylonia. An Aramaic inscription from Al-Karak, and dated from the 3rd century BC, mentions Kamōš.

Legacy

Biblical

According to the Biblical narrative, the Israelite king Šalōmō introduced the cults of ʿAštart, Kamōš and Melkom in east Jerusalem for his foreign concubines, and the later Judahite king Yōʾšī-Yahū later destroyed the high places of this deities during his reform of the cult of his kingdom.

In the Books of Kings of the Bible, the Moabite king  ( in Moabite) is alleged to have sacrificed his own son to Kamōš on the wall of his city when faced with a difficult situation in war, after which Kamōš rewarded Mēšaʿ by immediately starting to destroy the kingdom of Israel. The claim that Mēšaʿ sacrificed his son to Kamōš has so far remained unverifiable and is not attested in any Moabite inscription.

The 6th-century BC Judahite prophet Yīrmi-Yahū later announced that Kamōš as well as his priests and his princes would be exiled.

Cult

Functions

As the patron god of Moab, the Moabites believed that the anger of Kamōš against them would result in their subjugation, and his favour would ensure their independence and victory in war.

Based on the assumption that his name might have been the same as the epithet  of the Mesopotamian god of the underworld, Nerigal, the Moabite god Kamōš might also have had a chthonic aspect.

Temples
The main sanctuary of Kamōš in Moab was likely located in the important Moabite city of Qarīyōt, which is presently a site on a high hill where Iron Age I to II period Moabite remains, including potsherds, have been discovered.

The Moabite king Mōšaʿ recorded in his victory stela that he had built a high place dedicated to Kamōš in the citadel of the Moabite capital of Ḏaybān to thank the god for assuring his triumph in a military campaign against the Israelites.

This sanctuary's remains have however not yet been discovered, and it is unknown whether the cult of Kamōš was performed there.

Hypostases
Kamōš was equated with the Semitic high god  in the personal name , meaning "Kamōš is ʾĒl."

The astral role of ʿAštar itself is attested by his mention along with the Moon-God Šaggar in the Dayr ʿAllā inscription, the subject of which is largely the Sun-goddess Šamāš, thus forming a triad of the Sun, Moon, and Venus similarly to the one attested in South Arabia, and suggesting a South Arabian religious influence in Moab.

Iconography

Kamōš was likely the masculine deity represented in the Baluʿa Stele, in which he is depicted as handing a sceptre to a Moabite king.

The masculine figure represented on a Moabite stele from Shihan wearing a shendyt and holding a spear might also have been a depiction of Kamōš.

Kamōš might also have been represented in Hellenistic period Moabite coins as an armed figure standing between two torches.

Rites

Human sacrifice
The Moabites considered human sacrifice to Kamōš to be necessary to obtain the favour of Kamōš in critical situations, as attested by those performed by the Moabite king Mōšaʿ.

One form of human sacrifice to Kamōš was performed by Moabite kings to thank him for the accomplishment of a vow made to him in a military context, that is, in exchange of the Moabites' victory in war, the enemy population defeated in the said war was killed in the name of Kamōš. This is attested when Mōšaʿ had embarked on a policy of conquest of Israelite territories in the 9th century BC, and he slaughtered all of the inhabitants of the Gadite city of ʿAṭārōt as an accomplishment of a vow he had made to Kamōš and to the population of Moab, and he brought the warden of ʿAṭārōt, the Gadite chief ʾUrī-ʾEl, to the temple of Kamōš in Qarīyōt, where Mōšaʿ sacrificed him to Kamōš.

Enemy populations defeated in war were also directly sacficied to Kamōš, such as when, following his capture of ʿAṭārōt, Mōšaʿ conquered the town of Nebo, he sacrificed the whole Israelite population of the town to ʿAštar-Kamōš, likely because of ʿAštar's function as an avenger deity who was invoked in curses against enemies.

The Hebrew Bible claims that Mōšaʿ sacrificed his own son to Kamōš on the wall of his city when faced with a difficult situation in war, after which Kamōš rewarded Mēšaʿ by immediately starting to destroy the kingdom of Israel. The claim that Mēšaʿ sacrificed his son to Kamōš has so far remained unverifiable and is not attested in any Moabite inscription.

Animal sacrifice
After Mōšaʿ conquered Nebo, he brought all the lambs of the sanctuary of Yahū, that is of an important god of his Israelite enemies, at Nebo to the sanctuary of Kamōš, where he sacrificed them to Kamōš.

Sanctuary building
Moabite kings built sanctuaries for Kamōš to thank him once they had obtained his favour, as attested in the victory stela of Mōšaʿ recording that he had built a high place dedicated to Kamōš in the citadel of the Moabite capital of Ḏaybān to thank the god for assuring his triumph in his military campaign against the Israelites.

As theophoric element
 , romanized as: , 
 , romanized as: , 
 , romanized as: , 
 , romanized as: ,  or 
 , romanized as: , 
 , romanized as: ,  or 
 , romanized as: , 
 , romanized as: , 
 , romanized as: , 
 , romanized as: , 
 , romanized as: , 
 , romanized as: , 
 , romanized as: ,  or )
 , romanized as: , 
 , romanized as:

References

Sources

External links

West Semitic gods
Moab
Deities in the Hebrew Bible